Toumani Diabaté (born 10 August 1965) is a Malian kora player. In addition to performing the traditional music of Mali, he has also been involved in cross-cultural collaborations with flamenco, blues, jazz, and other international styles. In 2006, the London-based newspaper The Independent named Diabaté one of the fifty best African artists.

Biography
Diabaté comes from a long family tradition of kora players, including his father Sidiki Diabaté, who recorded the first-ever kora album in 1970. His family's oral tradition tells of 70 generations of musicians preceding him in a patrilineal line. His cousin Sona Jobarteh is the first female professional kora player to come from a Griot family. His younger brother Mamadou Sidiki Diabaté is also a prominent kora player.

In 1987, Diabate made an appearance, on Ba Togoma, an album featuring his father's ensemble. This was his opportunity to be heard outside his homeland. In 1988, he released his first album in the West, a solo endeavour entitled Kaira, recorded in one afternoon in London and produced by Lucy Durán.

In addition to performing Malian traditional music, Diabaté has also performed and recorded in cross-cultural settings. He has collaborated with flamenco group Ketama, forming a combined group known as Songhai and releasing two recordings: Songhai I and Songhai II. In 1999, Diabaté collaborated with American blues musician Taj Mahal on the release Kulanjan.  MALIcool is a collaboration with American jazz trombonist Roswell Rudd. He also collaborated with the Icelandic popular musician Björk on her 2007 album Volta.

In 1999, Diabaté released the album New Ancient Strings, a collaboration with Ballaké Sissoko. In September 2005, he released In the Heart of the Moon, for which he collaborated with Ali Farka Touré. The album went on to win the 2006 Grammy Award for Best Traditional World Music Album. On 25 July 2006, he released Boulevard de l'Indépendance, recorded with his Symmetric Orchestra. In the Heart of the Moon and Boulevard de l'Indépendance are both part of the Hotel Mandé Sessions, recorded by Nick Gold and released on World Circuit Records. Both Boulevard and Hotel Mandé are references to landmarks in Mali's capital city, Bamako.

The Symmetric Orchestra, led by Diabaté, is composed of musicians (mostly griots) from across the old Mande Empire of West Africa, who play a mix of traditional instruments including the kora, djembe, balafon, and bolombatto, as well as modern ones like the guitar and electronic keyboard.

Diabaté appeared in 2006 at the WOMAD Festival UK, Roskilde Festival in Denmark, and at the Sziget Festival in Budapest, Hungary. In 2007, he performed at the Glastonbury Festival and toured the US. In 2008, he was at WOMADelaide in Adelaide, Australia. In early 2008, Diabaté released a new album of solo kora music, The Mandé Variations, to widespread critical acclaim. Many reviewers praised the project for its detailed recording of the K
kora and careful mastering, in addition to the improvisational skills and wide range of apparent influences on display.

In October 2008, the Arabic-language lyrics in Diabaté's song "Tapha Niang" (from Boulevard de l'Indépendance) were removed from the PlayStation 3 video game LittleBigPlanet, after it elicited objections from a Muslim individual due to their inclusion of verses from the Qur’an. The publisher, Sony Computer Entertainment Europe, decided to delay the launch of the game by a week and recall most discs in order to replace the song with a lyric-free instrumental version. However, some copies of the original game had already been sold in the Middle East and United States.

Diabaté was chosen by Matt Groening to perform at the All Tomorrow's Parties festival in May 2010 in Minehead. Diabaté also performed at Hay Festival in June. In July, he performed at the Larmer Tree Festival to huge acclaim.

In February 2016, Diabaté hosted Festival Acoustik Bamako, a three-day music festival to bring together international and Malian musicians along with other public figures with an overall message of peace. It was planned as a collection of outdoor and indoor music events to draw crowds of more than 20,000 people. The 2015 Bamako hotel attack meant that all the outdoor events were cancelled, however.

Discography

 Ba Togoma (with Sidiki Diabaté|Sidiki Diabaté Sr., Mariama Kouyaté, Djeli Mady Sissoko, Kandia Kouayté) (1987)
 Kaira (1988)
 Songhai (with Ketama and Danny Thompson) (1988)
 Shake the Whole World (with the Symmetric Orchestra) (1992)
 Songhai 2 (with Ketama and Danny Thompson) (1994)
 The Rough Guide to West African Music (contributing artist) (1995)
 Djelika (1995)
 New Ancient Strings (with Ballaké Sissoko) (1999)
 Kulanjan (with Taj Mahal) (1999)
 Unwired: Acoustic Music from Around the World (contributing artist) (1999)
 Jarabi: the Best of Toumani Diabate (2001)
 Malicool (with Roswell Rudd) (2002)
 In the Heart of the Moon (with Ali Farka Touré) (2005)
 Boulevard de l'Indépendance (2006)
 The Mandé Variations (2008)
 Ali and Toumani - (with Ali Farka Touré) (2010)
 AfroCubism (2010)
 A Curva da Cintura (with Arnaldo Antunes and Edgard Scandurra) (2011)
 Toumani & Sidiki (with Sidiki Diabaté Jr.) (2014)
 Lamomali (with M and Sidiki Diabaté) (2017)
 The Ripple Effect (with Béla Fleck) (2020)
 Kôrôlén (with The London Symphony Orchestra) (2021)

Filmography
 Bamako Is a Miracle by Maurice Engler, Arnaud Robert, and Samuel Chalard (Afro Blue, Geneva, 2003).
 Toumani Diabaté - Koraklänge aus dem Land der Flusspferde by Martina Pfaff (WDR, Cologne, 2007).

References

External links

 Official Toumani Diabaté biography
 Afropop Worldwide Slideshow of Toumani Diabate Performing Live in Brooklyn (July 2007)
 The Kora Star (August 2007)
 'Our music is older than Bach' - Interview in The Guardian (October 2008)
 Information on the kora & Toumani Diabaté
 Ali and Toumani Review and interview with Tounami Diabaté| Folk Radio UK
 One on One - Toumani Diabate Al Jazeera

1965 births
21st-century Malian people
Grammy Award winners
Living people
Malian Kora players
Malian Muslims
World Circuit (record label) artists